Love Always is a 1996 American romantic comedy film directed by Jude Pauline Eberhard and starring Marisa Ryan.  It is Eberhard's directorial debut, based on Sharlene Baker's novel Finding Signs.

Plot

Cast
Marisa Ryan as Julia Bradshaw
Moon Zappa as Mary Ellen
James C. Victor as Sean
Michael Reilly Burke as Mark Righetti
Doug Hutchison as James
Beth Grant as Simon
Tracy Fraim as David Ritterman
Beverly D'Angelo as Miranda

Reception
Roger Ebert awarded the film half a star.

References

External links
 
 
 

1996 films
1996 directorial debut films
1996 romantic comedy films
1990s American films
1990s English-language films
American romantic comedy films
Films based on American novels
Films scored by Anton Sanko